Balikpapan Sport and Convention Center or can be locally referred to as Dome Balikpapan is a multipurpose indoor arena located in Balikpapan, Indonesia. The building was built by the Government of Balikpapan for 2008 Pekan Olahraga Nasional.

References

Sports venues in Indonesia
Sport in East Kalimantan
Sports venues in East Kalimantan
Sports venues in Balikpapan
Balikpapan
Buildings and structures in Balikpapan
Buildings and structures in East Kalimantan
Indoor arenas in Indonesia
Sports venues completed in 2008
Badminton venues
Taekwondo venues
Basketball venues in Indonesia
Volleyball venues in Indonesia